Zisis Tsekos (born 29 August 1964) is a former Greek footballer.

Club career
Tsekos joined Panserraikos in the Alpha Ethniki in July 1985, after four seasons with Panthrakikos in the lower divisions. He joined Apollon Kalamarias in July 1987, where he would play until moving to Paniliakos in July 1995.

International career
Tsekos made one appearance for the Greece national football team in March 1990 against Israel.

References

External links

1964 births
Living people
Association football midfielders
Greek footballers
Greece international footballers
Panthrakikos F.C. players
Panserraikos F.C. players
Apollon Pontou FC players
Paniliakos F.C. players
Ethnikos Asteras F.C. players
Olympiacos Volos F.C. players